Frank Henry Cooney (December 31, 1872 – December 15, 1935) was a Canadian-American politician and businessman who served as the ninth governor of Montana from 1933 to 1935.

Early life
Cooney was born in Norwood, Ontario, Canada, and received a limited education in Catholic schools. He dropped out of school at the age of fourteen and worked as a delivery boy in a grocery store and for a short time, he tried working with his father in the nursery business.

Career
Cooney moved to Butte, Montana in July, 1891, and found employment in a grocery store. He then found a position in the wholesale department of the Davidson Grocery Company.

In 1894, Cooney and his brother, Howard C. Cooney, started the firm of Cooney Brothers. Later it was incorporated under the name of Cooney Brokerage company, a success from the beginning. The company continued to expand with the additions of livestock and agricultural holdings. He was public administrator for Silver Bow County, Montana from 1898 to 1900.

Elected lieutenant governor in 1932, Cooney served until March 13, 1933, when he assumed the duties of Governor John Edward Erickson, who resigned so that Cooney could appoint him to Thomas J. Walsh's senate seat after Walsh's untimely death. Cooney is credited for reforming the state liquor laws and establishing a water conservation program.

Personal life
He married Emma May Poindexter Cooney on December 27, 1899, and the couple had six children, Francis H, John Phillip, Mary Margaret, Walter Poindexter, and twins, Tyler Thompson and Virginia Elizabeth.

Cooney died of heart failure on December 15, 1935, and was succeeded by Lieutenant Governor Elmer Holt. He is interred at Saint Mary Cemetery in Missoula. His grandson, Mike Cooney, is a politician who served as the 36th lieutenant governor of Montana.

See also
List of U.S. state governors born outside the United States

References

External links
  State of Montana profile
  National Governors Association biography
The Political Graveyard
Silver Bow Genealocy Trails

1872 births
1935 deaths
Lieutenant Governors of Montana
Democratic Party governors of Montana
People from Peterborough County
Politicians from Butte, Montana
Businesspeople from Montana
Canadian emigrants to the United States
Canadian people of Irish descent